Theodore Hesburgh (1917–2015) was a former president of the University of Notre Dame.

Hesburgh may also refer to:

 Hesburgh (film), a documentary film
 1952 Hesburgh, an asteroid
 Hesburgh Award
 Hesburgh Library, a library at Notre Dame

See also
 Father Hesburgh and Father Joyce, a statue